Calliano may refer to the following places in Italy:

 Calliano, Piedmont, a comune in the Province of Asti, in the regio of Piedmont
 Calliano, Trentino, a comune in the Province of Trentino, in the regio of Trentino-Alto Adige/Südtirol
 Battle of Calliano (1487), fought between Venetian and Austrian forces
 Battle of Calliano, fought 1796 between French and Austrian forces